County Route 559 (CR 559) is a county highway in the U.S. state of New Jersey. The highway extends  from the former Somers Point Circle at MacArthur Boulevard (Route 52) in Somers Point to Egg Harbor Road (CR 561) in Hammonton.

Route description

CR 559 begins at an intersection with Route 52 and the southern terminus of CR 585 (the former Somers Point Circle) in Somers Point, Atlantic County, heading west on two-lane undivided Somers Point-Mays Landing Road. The route runs between the Greate Bay Golf Club to the north and marshland to the south as it comes to the US 9 junction. From this point, the road runs near some residential areas prior to passing under the Garden State Parkway and crossing the marshy Patcong Creek into Egg Harbor Township. CR 559 heads northwest passes marshland and homes before turning north-northwest into wooded areas with a few residences. The route crosses CR 651 and  crosses the Lake Creek as heads northwest through more rural areas, turning more to the west as it intersects CR 575. After this intersection, the road crosses the English Creek and runs through more forested areas with some development as it comes to the CR 615 junction. Here, CR 559 turns west and northwest again through more rural areas, eventually turning north as it begins to run a short distance to the east of the Great Egg Harbor River. The route continues into Hamilton Township, where the road turns northeast into increasing areas of forested residential development. This is where the road intersects CR 559 Alternate. The road continues northwest past more forests and development, coming to an intersection with US 40 and CR 617 in the community of Mays Landing.

At this point, CR 559 forms a concurrency with US 40 and heads west through areas of homes and businesses on Main Street, coming to an intersection with Route 50. At this point, US 40 and CR 559 Truck head south on Route 50 and CR 559 continues west past more residences before turning south onto Lenape Street and crossing Lake Lenape. The route leaves Mays Landing as it turns west onto Weymouth Road, with CR 616 heading south along Lenape Street. CR 559 enters densely forested areas as it intersects the northern terminus of CR 559 Truck and CR 606 and turns to the north-northwest. The road continues northwest through the forests, with occasional residences, prior to turning north and then northeast as it meets US 322 (Black Horse Pike) at a modified traffic circle. From here, the route passes over the Great Egg Harbor River again and intersects CR 623, at which point CR 559 turns northwest. The road runs through more forests before making a turn to the north and running between woods to the west and farms to the east. CR 559 passes over the Atlantic City Expressway before splitting from Weymouth Road by heading northwest on 2nd Road, with CR 640 continuing north on Weymouth Road. The road runs through more forests before entering Hammonton at the 7th Street intersection, where it enters a mix of farms, woods, and homes. The route turns north onto Chew Road and continues to an intersection with Route 54. Past this intersection, CR 559 runs through residential areas, intersecting CR 678 before turning northwest and reaching its northern terminus at 15th Street a short distance from CR 561.

History
As part of improvements to Route 52, including the construction of a new causeway over the Great Egg Harbor Bay, the Somers Point Circle at the southern terminus of County Route 559 was replaced with a traffic light in October 2010.

Due to damage caused by Hurricane Irene to a bridge over English Creek, CR 559 was closed to through traffic from CR 575 to CR 615 from August 2011 to June 12, 2015. From October 2015 to May 2016, traffic from CR 575 to CR 559 Alternate was detoured for replacement of the Catawba Bridge over Miry Run. The replacement bridge opened in May 2016.

Major intersections

Special routes

CR 559 Alternate

County Route 559 Alternate, abbreviated CR 559 Alt, is a county highway in the U.S. state of New Jersey. The highway extends  from Shore Road (CR 585) on the boundary of Linwood and Somers Point to Somers Point-Mays Landing Road (CR 559) in Hamilton Township.

The road travels through the following municipalities (from South to North):
Linwood (Atlantic County)
Egg Harbor Township
Hamilton Township (Atlantic County)

Major intersections

CR 559 Truck

County Route 559 Truck (CR 559 Truck) is a truck bypass of the portion of CR 559 through Mays Landing. The truck route begins at US 40/Route 50/CR 559 in Mays Landing. Northbound, the truck route heads south along US 40/Route 50 from CR 559. Southbound, trucks are directed to follow CR 617 (Somers Point-Mays Landing Road) from US 40/Route 50 east to US 40 and CR 559 east of Mays Landing. From the CR 617 intersection, CR 559 Truck continues to follow US 40/Route 50, curving to the west. Route 50 splits to the south, and CR 559 Truck continues west concurrent with US 40 and CR 557 Truck. CR 559 Truck splits from US 40/CR 557 Truck by heading northeast on CR 606 (Old Harding Highway). The truck route follows CR 606 until it ends at an intersection with CR 559 west of Mays Landing.

Major intersections

See also

References

External links

New Jersey 5xx Routes (Dan Moraseski)

559
559